Michael Beinhorn is a North American record producer, composer, author and musician. He has produced albums for Red Hot Chili Peppers, Soundgarden, Hole, Violent Femmes and Marilyn Manson.

Career

1977-1983: Early Years, Material, Herbie Hancock
Beinhorn began his career as a Synthesist. His first instrument was a Moog Micromoog, after which he began working with a Sequential Circuits Prophet 5, an EMS Synthi AKS, Oberheim OB-Xa and Rhodes Chroma, as well as other instruments such as a Roland TR-808 drum machine, Roland SVC-350 Vocoder, Oberheim DMX drum machine and Oberheim DSX sequencer. Later, he began using such instruments as ARP 2600, as well as Moog modular and Serge Modular systems. He received formal training in synthesizer programming on the Buchla 200 series modular systems at Public Access Synthesizer Studio in New York City.

In 1977, Beinhorn met bassist Bill Laswell and together, with his friends Fred Maher and Cliff Cultreri, they formed the Zu Band (so-named by legendary European music impresario, producer/manager Giorgio Gomelsky- whose primary claims to notoriety were as manager/owner of London's infamous Crawdaddy Club, former manager and producer of The Yardbirds and manager of The Rolling Stones for a weekend).

After Gomelsky produced the Zu Band's first recording, the group ended their relationship with him and began self-producing. About a year following their first release and their first shows in New York City (at such legendary nightclubs as CBGB, Mudd Club, Hurrah and Tier 3), they changed their band name to Material.

By 1980, Maher and Cultreri had left Material. As a duo, Beinhorn and Laswell collaborated on various projects with a variety of musical artists, such as Nile Rodgers, David Byrne, Sonny Sharrock, Nona Hendryx, Bernie Worrell, Patti LaBelle, Tony Thompson, etc.

One ongoing collaboration was with musical luminary Brian Eno and eventually yielded the track Lizard Point from the 4th and final recording in Eno's Ambient series, Ambient 4: On Land. The following year, the duo recorded a young up and coming singer named Whitney Houston on a version of the Soft Machine song “Memories" which also featured the legendary free jazz tenor sax player, Archie Shepp.

That year (1981), they produced and composed "Change the Beat" by Fab Five Freddy which became the source of the infamous “Fresh Scratch"(which included the sound of a voice controlling the Oberheim OBXa synthesizer through the Roland SVC350 vocoder reciting "Ahhhh...this stuff is really frrreshh"). This led to Beinhorn's work in 1983 on Herbie Hancock's record Future Shock which included the groundbreaking track, "Rockit" (which featured the first ever usage of the “Fresh Scratch” as a turntable scratch. Another element was its usage of programmed drum fill breaks as thematic motifs). Beinhorn co-produced, co-wrote, and programmed the Oberheim DMX drum machine, synthesizers and Lexicon M.93 Prime Time sampler on the track. As a result of its usage in "Rockit", the "Fresh Scratch" has subsequently become the most sampled sound in the world.

Along with such seminal recordings as "The Message" by Grandmaster Flash and the Furious Five, "Planet Rock" by Soulsonic Force and "Numbers" by Kraftwerk, "Rockit” was one of the most important recordings from the early 1980s that helped elevate the nascent form of hip hop from an underground music genre, into the international spotlight. Having the distinction of being one of the earliest videos on MTV, “Rockit” also had a much greater reach and success than any of its predecessors. The track went on to win Best R&B Instrumental Performance at the 1984 Grammy Awards (also receiving a nomination for Best Instrumental Composition), as well as five VMA's at the 1984 MTV Video Music Awards where Herbie was the show's most awarded artist.

1984-1989: Leaving Material, work with Red Hot Chili Peppers
Beinhorn set out on his own, leaving Material in 1984. Two years later, he found himself in a speeding van with a struggling Los Angeles band called Red Hot Chili Peppers who were late to a gig in Dallas, Texas. The end result of that van ride was 1987's The Uplift Mofo Party Plan, which finally put the band on the map. The record was as much a chronicle of Los Angeles- the city the band loved- as it was of their lives and the unlikely journey everyone went through to get the record made. Bass player Flea later referred to the album as "the 'rockingest' record" the band has ever made.

The unexpected success of Uplift gave The Chili Peppers a leg up with their label, EMI, and in 1989, Beinhorn produced the group's next recording, Mother's Milk. This recording featured their first breakthrough international hit single, "Higher Ground". Mothers Milk went on to sell over one million records in the United States as of 1995 and brought the band international renown.

1989-1994: Producing Soul Asylum, Soundgarden
After his success with the Chili Peppers, Beinhorn began a working streak which culminated in him producing Soul Asylum's 1992 breakthrough record, Grave Dancers Union. The third single from this record, "Runaway Train" went to number five on the Billboard Top 100 singles chart, selling 600,000 copies, and its video became a perennial staple on MTV for years after (with over 150 million views on YouTube, the video is still popular and has helped to reunite 26 missing children with their families). The album spent 76 weeks in the Billboard Top 200 Album charts, sold over three million copies in the United States (as of 1993), and netted the band a 1994 Grammy Award for Best Rock Song.

Beinhorn's next production was for the Seattle band, Soundgarden. The result of their collaboration was the 1994 smash Superunknown, which went straight to number one on the Billboard 200 album charts in its first week of release (directly above Nine Inch Nails legendary recording, The Downward Spiral). Eventually spawning 5 singles and featuring the iconic track "Black Hole Sun", Superunknown netted the band two 1995 Grammy Awards (Best Hard Rock/Metal Performance for “Black Hole Sun” and Best Rock Song for "Spoonman") and sold over 9 million copies worldwide as of 1995.

The critical acclaim garnered by Superunknown has led to its inclusion in multiple greatest albums lists. Rolling Stone Magazine ranked Superunknown number 9 on their list of Greatest Grunge Albums Of All Time, number 38 on their list of the 100 Best Records Of The 1990s and number 335 of the Best 500 Records Of All Time lists from 2003 and 2012. It is also number 779 in the book, “1001 Records You Must Hear Before You Die”. In a retrospective review, AllMusic editor Steve Huey wrote, "It's obvious that Superunknown was consciously styled as a masterwork, and it fulfills every ambition."

Beinhorn recently detailed the process of recording Superunknown while appearing on The Pods & Sods Network. He shared his reaction to first hearing "Black Hole Sun" during that time, “I think for the rest of my entire life, until I draw my last breath, I’ll never ever forget how I felt when they started playing that song. From the very first few notes, I felt like I’d been hit by a thunderbolt. I was just absolutely stunned. What in the world is this? I get goosebumps thinking about it now.”

1995-1999: Two Inch Eight Track, Hole, Marilyn Manson
Over the next three years, Beinhorn produced records for Aerosmith, Ozzy Osbourne, Living Colour and Social Distortion. In 1994, he conceived of a new multitrack recording format- an analog 8 track tape recorder with a 2-inch head block that also included a time code reader so it could sync with other tape machines, consoles, etc. The system was dubbed "Ultra-Analog" by CN Fletcher of Mercenary Audio and had its maiden voyage on the 1995 Ozzy Osbourne record Ozzmosis.

In 1997, Beinhorn was approached by the group Hole to produce their next recording. The resulting project was called Celebrity Skin, which took nearly a year to finish, and spawned 2 singles ("Celebrity Skin", "Malibu") and sold nearly 4 million records worldwide. As well as receiving two Grammy Nominations in 1999, it is number 871 in the book "1001 Records To Hear Before You Die". Celebrity Skin was still being mixed when Beinhorn moved on to his next project- Marilyn Manson iconic Mechanical Animals. Coincidentally, both records were finished and released at the same time, giving Beinhorn the distinction of being the first record producer in history to have two records debut in the Top Ten positions of the Billboard album charts, (with Manson at number 1 and Hole at number 9) in the same week (September 15, 1998). As a result, Beinhorn was nominated for Producer of the Year at the 1999 Grammy Awards.

2000-2002: Atlantic Records, Korn
Seeking an opportunity to make artist development an industry standard once again, he gladly accepted when Atlantic Records offered him an Executive Vice President A&R position in 1999. While working at Atlantic, Beinhorn had the opportunity to collaborate with such diverse artists as Pharrell Williams, André 3000 and Chad Hugo as well as the director Oliver Stone on his film, "Any Given Sunday". However, Beinhorn found that Atlantic wasn't the place to initiate an artist development agenda and in 2002, he returned to independent record production with Korn's groundbreaking recording, Untouchables.

Untouchables was a sprawling, ambitious work which mirrored the raw creativity, excess, frantic excitement and stress that went into making it. It was also one of the first rock albums to be recorded in 96 kHz/24 bit high-resolution digital audio and mixed in the Direct Stream Digital format. Entering the Billboard Top 200 Album Chart at number two, (right under Eminem’s The Eminem Show) and selling 434,000 copies in its first week of release, it spawned five singles and sold over four million records worldwide. It also netted Korn their first ever Grammy Award ("Here to Stay"- Grammy Award for Best Metal Performance- 2004) and is singer Jonathan Davis' favorite Korn record.

Jonathan Davis- "We were coming off of Issues, and we wanted to make an amazing record. That’s when we hooked up with Michael Beinhorn, and Beinhorn’s whole vision was to make an amazing sounding rock record that could never be made again. [...] I wanted to shoot a documentary about that record. We spent so much money, on the drums alone we spent a whole month just getting drum sounds. There were 50 mics just on the drumset that they picked out and tested. [...] Usually, I do my vocals and it takes me a month or two weeks, but just vocals it took me five, almost six months. With Beinhorn, sometimes I’d walk in and sing and he’d just say, “Go home, your voice ain’t right.” [...] It was the peak and pinnacle of everything in Korn. I still can’t believe how much work went in on it. It was a lot."

2003-Present 
From 2003, Beinhorn went on to work with a diverse array of artists such as Fuel, Mew, The Bronx, Courtney Love, Pete Yorn, Natalie Maines, Leon Russell and Dave Grohl. In 2015, Beinhorn wrote a book called "Unlocking Creativity" (published by Hal Leonard) which outlines his personal experience with the creative process as a record producer.

However, his attention consistently returned to the issue of artist development, as well as other concerns facing artists, producers and other individuals who are trying to maintain their creative ethics in the radically shifting environment of a new music industry. Being a staunch advocate of album pre-production, he also felt the need to address the changing music industry climate and the lack of reasonable budgets available to most musicians.

To address these concerns and redefine the role of the music producer through the incorporation of new technology, Beinhorn started one of the world's first completely remote services for working with artists and producing music in 2018, called Beinhorn Creative. He sees this as a way to help musicians achieve their greatest potential while pursuing a return to excellence.

Productions discography
1979: Temporary Music 1 - Material
1980: Temporary Music 2 - Material
1981: Memory Serves - Material
1981: Nona - Nona Hendryx
1981: Change The Beat - Fab Five Freddy
1982: One Down - Material
1983: Future Shock - Herbie Hancock
1983: The Art of Defense - Nona Hendryx
1984: At the Feet of the Moon - The Parachute Club
1986: Love's Imperfection - Idle Eyes
1987: The Uplift Mofo Party Plan - Red Hot Chili Peppers
1989: Mother's Milk - Red Hot Chili Peppers
1990: Mercurotones - The Buck Pets
1991: Why Do Birds Sing? - Violent Femmes1991: Hot Diggity - Raw Youth
1992: Grave Dancers Union - Soul Asylum
1992: Soul Martini - Cavedogs
1993: Numb - Hammerbox
1993: Far Gone - Love Battery
1994: Superunknown - Soundgarden
1994: "Blind Man" and "Walk on Water" - Aerosmith
1995: Ozzmosis - Ozzy Osbourne
1996: White Light, White Heat, White Trash - Social Distortion
1997: Big Windshield Little Mirror - Foam
1998: Celebrity Skin - Hole
1998: Mechanical Animals - Marilyn Manson
1999: The Verve Pipe - The Verve Pipe
1999: "Be a Man" - Hole
2000: "Painted on My Heart" - The Cult
2002: Untouchables - Korn
2003: Natural Selection - Fuel
2003: Greatest Hits - Red Hot Chili Peppers
2004: Lest We Forget: The Best Of - Marilyn Manson
2005: Permanent Record: The Very Best of Violent Femmes - Violent Femmes
2005: The Best of Fuel - Fuel
2005: And the Glass Handed Kites - Mew
2006: A Public Display of Affection - The Blizzards
2006: Shot to Hell - Black Label Society
2006: Nightcrawler - Pete Yorn
2006: The Bronx - The Bronx
2007: Everything Last Winter - Fields
2008: The Sucker Punch Show - Lovedrug
2008: Domino Effect - The Blizzards
2010: Nobody's Daughter - Hole
2015: + - - Mew
2016: Control'' - Kensington

References

External links
michaelbeinhorn.com
Michael Beinhorn Discography by Christian Genzel
Michael Beinhorn biography at Artists Direct

21st-century American keyboardists
American record producers
Living people
Year of birth missing (living people)
Material (band) members
The Ozzy Osbourne Band members
Deadline (band) members